Dragan Zdravković (born 16 December 1959, in Senjski Rudnik) is a Serbian former middle-distance runner. He represented Yugoslavia in international competition from the late 1970s to 1980s, and was a finalist at the 1980 Summer Olympics. Zdravković holds multiple outdoor and indoor Serbian records in athletics.

Running career
Zdravković initially practiced football as a youngster in Ćuprija, until a school teacher, Aleksandar "Aca" Petrović, suggested that he begin training athletics. Zdravković's youth coaches emphasized gymnastics as a complement to his running workouts. At the age of 21 he made his Olympic debut at the 1980 Summer Olympics. In the men's 1500 meters, he progressed through the qualifying heat and semi-final rounds, but finished last in the finals. In spite of this, he was particularly happy to race with Steve Ovett:

On 6 March 1983 Zdravković won the men's men's 3000 meters at the European Indoor Championships. On 15 July 1983 he won the men's 1500 meters in 3:35.28 (min:sec) at the Crystal Palace National Sports Centre in an upset over Sebastian Coe.

He had qualified for the 1984 Summer Olympics, but the Athletics Federation of Yugoslavia had a sportswear contract with Adidas, and after not changing his sportswear to Adidas, Zdravković was taken off the Yugoslavian 1984 Olympic team.

International competitions

See also
List of European Athletics Indoor Championships medalists (men)

References

1959 births
Living people
People from Senjski Rudnik
Serbian male middle-distance runners
Yugoslav male middle-distance runners
Serbian male cross country runners
Yugoslav male cross country runners
Olympic athletes of Yugoslavia
Athletes (track and field) at the 1980 Summer Olympics
Mediterranean Games silver medalists for Yugoslavia
Athletes (track and field) at the 1979 Mediterranean Games
Universiade medalists in athletics (track and field)
World Athletics Championships athletes for Yugoslavia
Mediterranean Games medalists in athletics
Universiade bronze medalists for Yugoslavia